Johnny Rumley (born April 14, 1957) is an American former stock car racing driver. He won twice in the Busch Series, but has not been seen in the major leagues of NASCAR since 2000.

Rumley made his debut at New River Valley Speedway in 1992. Rumley went out in his No. 25 Beverly Racing Olds and won the pole, and finished 10th in the race. Then, at the very next race at Orange County, Rumley managed a 9th-place finish.

Rumley made five races in 1993, and only had one top-10 finish. Rumley scored what was considering an upset victory at Hickory, pulling his No. 00 Big Dog Coal Chevy into victory lane in just his seventh start. In addition, Rumley had two other top-20s in the season.

Rumley returned in 1994, running thirteen races. He only earned two top-10s, back-to-back finishes of eighth in his first two-season starts. However, in the next eleven races, driving the No. 41 White House Ford, Rumley could only manage a best finish of 18th and a best start of 9th. Yet, Rumley still recorded his highest points position in his career with a 33rd.

Rumley had three top-10s in his seventeen starts in 1995. Rumley picked up his second win at Dover International Speedway, leading eleven laps en route to victory. In addition to his win, Rumley had a 6th at Dover, 7th at New Hampshire and three other top-dozen finishes. Overall, it resulted in a 28th-place finish in points.

However, despite his quick success, Rumley still could not attract a full-time ride and following his part-time run in 1995 driving the No. 25 Big Johnson Chevrolet alternating with Kirk Shelmerdine, Rumley's career began to fade. In six starts in 1996, Rumley's best finish was a 16th at Daytona and a 17th at Darlington. It was the first time in his career that Rumley did not record a top-10 in a season.

Rumley returned for two more races in 1997, driving the No. 27 RGM Chevy at Nashville and a 30th at South Boston. Yet, he was 42nd and 30th in those races respectively, and he did not finish either race.

Rumley disappeared seemingly after his run at South Boston. Yet, he came back in 2000, to drive six races for the fledgling Alumni Motorsports. However, he could only manage a best finish of 29th at Dover and Nazareth, as well having struggles in qualifying. Without that success, Rumley currently drives in the USAR Hooters Pro Cup North series, driving for Dale Earnhardt Jr.'s JR Motorsports.

Motorsports career results

NASCAR
(key) (Bold – Pole position awarded by qualifying time. Italics – Pole position earned by points standings or practice time. * – Most laps led.)

Busch Series

References

External links
 

Living people
NASCAR drivers
People from Summerfield, North Carolina
Racing drivers from North Carolina
CARS Tour drivers
1957 births